The Ortelec is a left tributary of the river Agrij in Romania. It flows into the Agrij in Creaca.

References

Rivers of Romania
Rivers of Sălaj County